Jeremy Daniel Kernodle (born 1976) is a United States district judge of the United States District Court for the Eastern District of Texas.

Biography 

Kernodle earned his Bachelor of Arts and Bachelor of Business Administration from Harding University, and his Juris Doctor from Vanderbilt University Law School, where he was valedictorian of his class.

Upon graduation from law school, he served as a law clerk to Judge Gerald Bard Tjoflat of the United States Court of Appeals for the Eleventh Circuit. Later, he practiced appellate and commercial litigation at Covington & Burling as an associate. After his stint at Covington & Burling, he served in the United States Department of Justice Office of Legal Counsel as an attorney-advisor.

Before becoming a judge, he was a partner at Haynes and Boone, where he founded the False Claims Act practice group and worked on healthcare litigation.

Federal judicial service 

On January 23, 2018, President Donald Trump nominated Kernodle to the seat on the United States District Court for the Eastern District of Texas vacated by Judge Michael H. Schneider Sr., who assumed senior status on January 7, 2016. On May 9, 2018, a hearing on his nomination was held before the Senate Judiciary Committee. On June 7, 2018, his nomination was reported out of committee by a 14–7 vote. On October 11, 2018, his nomination was confirmed by voice vote. He received his judicial commission on November 2, 2018.

In December 2020, Texas Republican congressman Louis Gohmert and others filed a suit in Kernodle's court, naming vice president Mike Pence as a defendant in arguing he constitutionally has "sole discretion in determining which electoral votes to count for a given State, and must ignore and may not rely on any provisions of the Electoral Count Act that would limit his exclusive authority." Pence and the Justice Department asked that the suit be dismissed, with the DOJ arguing that the suit "does not properly lie against the Vice President, and
plaintiffs’ suit can be resolved on a number of threshold issues," and that the suit was not filed in a timely manner to justify "expedited declaratory judgment and emergency injunctive relief against the Vice President." Kernodle dismissed the suit on January 1, 2021, ruling that Gohmert and the other plaintiffs lacked standing, and that Gohmert "suffered no legally recognizable injury".

References

External links 
 

1976 births
Living people
21st-century American lawyers
21st-century American judges
Federalist Society members
Harding University alumni
Judges of the United States District Court for the Eastern District of Texas
People from Memphis, Tennessee
Texas lawyers
Texas Republicans
United States Department of Justice lawyers
United States district court judges appointed by Donald Trump
Vanderbilt University Law School alumni